The Silver Bullet Express, also known as the Sunday River Ski Train, was a privately owned and operated ski train that ran from Portland, Maine to  Sunday River Ski Resort near Bethel, Maine. The ski train was owned by Sunday River and sponsored by Coors Light. The train left Portland at 6:45 am, arriving in Bethel at 8:45 am where passengers transferred to Buses which would take them to the mountain. The return trip would depart Bethel at 5:15 pm. Amenities included a dining car, parlor car, and a retrofitted boxcar for carrying skis and snowboards. It operated from 1993 until 1996.

History

In 1993, Les Otten who owned Sunday River envisioned a ski train that would connect the mountain with Auburn, Portland and Boston (through a Portland to Boston passenger rail line that never materialized until 2001 in the form of the Amtrak Downeaster). Otten appointed Carl Spangler to head the ski train effort. That summer a set of seven heritage cars was purchased from Indiana Rail Road, and the St. Lawrence and Atlantic Railroad was hired to operate the train. Buses were also purchased from Chicago Transit Authority to carry skiers from the station in Bethel to the mountain.

References

Transportation in New England
Railway services introduced in 1993
Railway services discontinued in 1997
Named passenger trains of the United States
Passenger rail transportation in Maine
Transportation in Portland, Maine
Transportation in Oxford County, Maine
Transportation in Androscoggin County, Maine
Transportation in Cumberland County, Maine
Newry, Maine